Darwish and Darvish (and in French more prominently Darwich and Darwiche) are alternate transliterations of the Persian word "dervish", used in , referring to a Sufi aspirant.  There is no v sound in most Modern Arabic dialects and so the originally Persian word is usually pronounced with a w sound in Arabic.  The word appears as a surname in the Levant or for people descended from Levantine communities, particularly in Lebanon, Syria, Israel territories,Afghanistan and the Palestinian . In Iraq, the surname, which in Arabic means "wandering, roaming", has been borne by people of Jewish descent as well. 

An etymology for the name is given in the Oxford Dictionary of American Family Names:

Notable people
Darvish
Refer to Darvish
Darwish
 Abdullah Nimar Darwish (1948-2017), Arab-Israeli politician, founder of the Islamic Movement in Israel
 Adel Darwish, British political journalist, author, historian, broadcaster, and political commentator of Egyptian origin
 Ahmad Darwish, Syrian footballer
 Ihab Darwish, Emirati composer
 Karim Darwish (born 1981), Egyptian squash player 
 Khalid Darwish (born 1979), Emirati footballer
 Mahmoud Darwish (1941–2008), Palestinian poet and author
 Nonie Darwish (born 1949), Egyptian-American human rights activist
 Sayed Darwish (1892–1923), Egyptian composer and singer, considered the father of Egyptian popular music
 Tiffany Darwish (born 1971), American singer and former teen icon. Known popularly by her mononym Tiffany
al-Darwish
 Mustafa al-Darwish (1994-2021), Saudi Arabian protester.
Darwich/Darwiche 
 Ahmad Darwich (born 1977), Lebanese-Danish DJ and music producer and co-founder of Kashcow record label
 Adnan "Eddie" Darwiche, Australian double murderer from Sydney, New South Wales, currently serving 2 sentences of life imprisonment
 Fadde Darwich (born 1966), Swedish stand-up comedian of Syrian origin

See also
Darwiche-Razzak-Fahda family conflict, series of murders and assaults carried out between three Australian families of Lebanese descent in south-west Sydney, Australia between February 2001 and March 2009. The Darwiche family refers to Farouk "Frank" Darwiche and his children Albert, Michael, Abdul, Adnan, Ali and Khadjie
Darweesh v. Trump, a court case

See also
 Derviş

Arabic-language surnames
Surnames